Vilakku Vangiya Veena is a 1975 Indian Malayalam film, directed and produced by P. Bhaskaran. The film stars Prem Nazir, Madhu, Sharada, Usha and KPAC Lalitha in the lead roles. The film had musical score by V. Dakshinamoorthy.

Plot 
Sarada, who is in love with Vijayan, a struggling singer, decides to sell her gold to send him to Madras to pursue his career. However, things change when he becomes successful and forgets about her.

Cast

Prem Nazir as Vijayan
Madhu as Venu
Sharada as Sarada
KPAC Lalitha as Vijayan's Sister Geetha
Jayabharathi as Sunanda
Adoor Bhasi as Menon
Jose Prakash as KR Das
Sankaradi as Sankarappillai
T. R. Omana as Nirmala
T. S. Muthaiah as Raghavan
Paul Vengola SKariya Mappila
Abbas as Money Lender
Adoor Bhavani as Parvathy
Bahadoor as Prathapan 
Girish Kumar
M. J. Menon
Vanchiyoor Radha

Soundtrack

References

External links
 

1971 films
1970s Malayalam-language films
Films directed by P. Bhaskaran